Forest Warrior is a 1996 American adventure film starring Chuck Norris and directed by Norris's brother Aaron Norris. The film was released on direct-to-video in the United States on November 5, 1996. The film is perhaps best known since late 2011 as the source of a scene in which Chuck (a ubiquitous Internet meme himself) stops a chainsaw by grabbing it with his bare hand. The scene has been reposted numerous times on YouTube with views totaling several million, as well as made into an animated GIF for use on Internet forums and message boards. Another memorable scene features a logger who air guitars with his chainsaw.

Plot
The film opens with a campfire story being told by Clovis Madison (Roscoe Lee Browne) to a group of children, about a man named Jebediah McKenna (Chuck Norris) who was killed a century ago in the Tanglewood forest while fighting bandits. McKenna was magically brought back to life and given the power to transform into a bear, wolf, or eagle. Inspired by this tale, the children dub their group the Lords of the Tanglewood, complete with the following pledge: "We ask you to leave it pure as found; For we are to it forever bound."

During the present day, the Tanglewood forest is targeted for harvesting by a logging conglomerate directed by villainous lumber magnate Travis Thorne (Terry Kiser). Most of the small town is against their deforestation, including the kids, who regularly camp out in a treehouse in the woods. During one of their trips, a group of loggers bully the kids, only to get beaten up by McKenna, the legendary shapeshifter, who also happens to be a master of Native American martial arts. The loggers report this to Thorne, who orders the treehouse destroyed. While the kids are gone, the loggers place a bomb in the treehouse, unaware that the Tanglewood Lords' leader - and sole female member - Austene Slaighter (Megan Paul) is still there. McKenna beats up the loggers again, then uses the forest's magic to resurrect Austene just like he had been.

Austene is reunited with her father Arlen (Michael Beck), once the town's deputy sheriff but now its token drunk. Meanwhile, Thorne obtains a permit to continue logging. The Lords of the Tanglewood rally in response to this; they prank the loggers with numerous boobytraps, impeding Thorne's efforts to chop down the forest. They also play rock music on a ghetto-blaster, which causes the loggers to dance around idiotically. Finally, McKenna appears before Thorne and intimidates him by turning into a bear; the terrified villain calls off the deforestation and confesses all of his wrongdoing to the authorities. With their forest saved, the townspeople rebuild the kids' treehouse while Austene sees McKenna's spirit reunited with that of his Native American wife.

Cast

 Chuck Norris as Jebediah McKenna
 Terry Kiser as Travis Thorne
 Max Gail as Sheriff Ramsey
 Michael Beck as Arlen Slaighter
 Roscoe Lee Browne as Clovis Madison
 Loretta Swit as Shirley
 Megan Paul as Austene Slaighter
 Rags the bear cub as himself

Production

Filming
The film was shot in Oregon in 56 days from January 14 until March 10, 1996.

Reception

Critical Response
The film received mixed reviews from critics. Jonathan P wrote on Rotten Tomatoes, "Don't watch this unless you are expecting a film made for children. This is Chuck Norris in his most family-friendly movie to date. The plot is absurd and the acting pretty bad but again take it for what it is. I didn't expect a children's movie so was quite disappointed but I would imagine kids will enjoy it well enough".

Doug Walker, aka "The Nostalgia Critic", has called the picture "a must-see for anybody who refuses to believe there are worse roles an actor can get stuck with than that of a corpse (referring to Terry Kiser's deceased title character in Weekend at Bernie's)."

According to Richard Scheib on Wayback Machine, the picture is "...A desperate and ungainly attempt by Chuck Norris to reinvent himself as anything other than a one-dimensional macho-man (in this case, as a liberal eco-defender), with woeful results. Norris possesses all the acting ability of a tree-trunk; he simply doesn't have the range for something like this...The film takes its whole quasi-Sierra Club/Green-consciousness thing far too seriously. The reverence-for-the-land solemnity becomes absurd: the bad guys are blatant caricatures, being constantly associated with ecologically-unfriendly montages (smoke-belching trucks and factories, trees being mulched, etcetera); there are also lots of cute animals, with Rags the bear-cub giving a better performance than any of the human leads...The third act descends into Home Alone-style slapstick, with lots of childish sadism against the shallow and buffoonish heavies, all in the name of environmentalism...Although his name sells (or at least is supposed to sell) the movie, Norris stays off-screen for most of the running time; the film mostly concerns itself with the juvenile "Lords of Tanglewood" playing in their treehouse and gleefully torturing the inept, brain-dead villains."

Accolades
Young Artist Awards
 1997: Nominated, "Best Performance in a TV Movie/Home Video by a Young Ensemble" – Trenton Knight, Megan Paul, Josh Wolford, Michael Friedman, and Jordan Brower

See also

 List of American films of 1996
 Chuck Norris filmography

References

External links
 
 
 Forest Warrior film review
 Chuck Norris stops a chainsaw bare handed original YouTube post
 Chainsaw scene gif 

1996 films
1996 direct-to-video films
1990s adventure films
1996 fantasy films
American adventure comedy films
American fantasy films
American ghost films
American independent films
Direct-to-video adventure films
Environmental films
Films about shapeshifting
Films set in forests
Films directed by Aaron Norris
Films set in Oregon
Films shot in Oregon
Internet memes
Film and television memes
Nu Image films
1990s English-language films
1990s American films